Velika Remeta is a village in Serbia. It is situated in the Irig municipality, in the Srem District, Vojvodina province. The village has a Serb ethnic majority and its population numbering 42 people (2002 census). The Velika Remeta Monastery is located near the village.

See also
List of places in Serbia
List of cities, towns and villages in Vojvodina
Velika Remeta Monastery

References

Populated places in Syrmia